Alexander Ivanovich Yakovlev (spelled Jakowlew, Jakowleff, Jakovlev in German and French), (1863–1909) was a Russian entomologist and painter. He is not to be confused with Vasily Evgrafovich Yakovlev (1839–1908) also an entomologist who lived in St. Petersburg.

Jakovlev was of German origin. He lived in Saint Petersburg . He was primarily interested in Coleoptera.

He wrote:-

[Яковлев, А.И.] Jakovlev, A.I. Dytiscides nouveaux on peu connus I. Horae Societitas Entomologicae Rossicae 30:175-183 (1896).
Dytiscides nouveaux on peu connus. II Horae Societitas Entomologicae Rossicae32:504–509 (1898,1899).
Dytiscidarum novarum diagnoses L’Abeille.29:37-41. (1897)

Russian entomologists
1863 births
1909 deaths
Biologists from the Russian Empire
Painters from the Russian Empire
Russian male painters
19th-century painters from the Russian Empire
20th-century Russian painters
19th-century male artists from the Russian Empire
19th-century scientists from the Russian Empire
20th-century Russian scientists
Painters from Saint Petersburg
Russian people of German descent
20th-century Russian male artists